Suecy Beverly Callejas Estrada is a Salvadoran lawyer and politician, currently serving as the Vice-President of the Congress and as the Minister of Culture. She is a member of the Nuevas Ideas party. She studied modern dance at the Instituto Superior de Arte in Havana, Cuba and had a previous career as a dancer and dance teacher.

References

External links
 Perfil Ministra de Cultura Suecy Callejas (Profile of Minister of Culture Suecy Callejas

Living people
Culture ministers of El Salvador
Women government ministers of El Salvador
Salvadoran ballet dancers
21st-century Salvadoran women politicians
21st-century Salvadoran politicians
Year of birth missing (living people)
Place of birth missing (living people)
Nuevas Ideas politicians